This is a list of franchise records for the New York Islanders, a team forming part of the National Hockey League. It includes every franchise record ever won by the Islanders, regardless of whether a record was set previously.

Team records

Single season

Single game

Individual records

Career 
Skaters

Goalies

Single season 
Skaters

Goalies

Single game

References 

National Hockey League statistical records
records